Unica is a brand within HCL software, a part of HCL Technologies comprising multiple Enterprise Marketing Management components. It was formerly a brand within IBM. HCL acquired Unica as a part of $1.8 billion purchase of select IBM products

When purchased by IBM, Unica was managed by Yuchun Lee and had around 500 employees.

History

Unica was founded in 1992 by Yuchun Lee, Ruby Kennedy and David Cheung.  The company is headquartered in Waltham, Massachusetts, with additional offices in the US, Australia, France, Germany, India, Netherlands, Singapore, Spain, and the UK.  They primarily serve the financial services, insurance and healthcare, business-to-business services, retail, automotive, technology, telecommunications, travel and hospitality, media and publishing, energy, and pharmaceuticals markets. 

In August 2010, IBM announced the intent to acquire Unica for $480M.  In Oct 2010 the IBM acquisition of Unica was completed. Post acquisition, the Unica portfolio was focused to Unica Campaign, Unica Campaign Optimization, Unica Marketing Operations, and Unica Interact. The Unica suite also retain Detect and Distributed Marketing for legacy customers.

In December 2018, HCL Technologies announced the intent to acquire Unica including other IBM products such as, Appscan for secure application development, BigFix for secure device management, Portal for digital experience, Notes & Domino for email and low-code rapid application development, Commerce for omni-channel eCommerce, and Connections for workstream collaboration. HCL Technologies had been engaged with IBM in an intellectual property partnership where HCL provided services, support, and development previously for some of these. In July 2019, HCL Technologies completed the acquisition of Unica and other noted products and subsequently formed a completely new division named HCL Software to manage the new software portfolio.

As of July 2019 the Unica module names were streamlined and renamed to:
Unica Campaign  - Precision customer targeting at scale
Unica Plan - Enterprise grade marketing management
Unica Interact  - Real time personalization in milli seconds
Unica Optimize - Contact optimization for offers and channels

HCL Software has invested heavily in the Unica platform since 2019 with one major release and several minor releases per year. To date, HCL Software has released a V11.0, V11.1, V12.0 and upcoming V12.1. In the first year, Unica added over 2000 enhancements. With the July 2020 release, Unica will add three new products; Deliver, Journey, and Link which will be the largest expansion of the Unica platform in over 20 years. In addition, Unica will now be licensed as a wholistic platform instead of the individual product modules.

As of July 2020 the Unica marketing platform includes the below modules:
Unica Campaign  - Precision customer targeting at scale
Unica Plan - Enterprise grade marketing management
Unica Interact  - Real time personalization in milli seconds
Unica Optimize - Contact optimization for offers and channels
Unica Journey – Goal Based customer Journeys
Unica Deliver - Reliable & scalable messaging
Unica Link - Fast & flexible integration platform

References

https://www.hcltech.com/press-releases/press-releases-business/hcl-releases-unica-v120-announcing-new-cloud-native-unica

Customer relationship management software companies
IBM acquisitions
1992 establishments in Massachusetts
Companies based in Waltham, Massachusetts
Defunct software companies of the United States